Since 2004, the American business magazine Forbes has compiled an annual list of the 100 most powerful women in the world. It is edited by prominent Forbes journalists, including Moira Forbes, and is based on visibility and economic impact. Former German chancellor Angela Merkel held the top spot from 2006 to 2020, aside from 2010,  when she was temporarily supplanted by Michelle Obama, the then-first lady of the United States. The top 10 per year are listed below. There were at least six Americans each year, except for 2007, when there were five.

2022 

  Ursula von der Leyen, President of the European Commission
  Christine Lagarde, President of the European Central Bank
  Kamala Harris, Vice President of the United States
  Mary Barra, CEO of General Motors
  Abigail Johnson, President-CEO of Fidelity Investments
  Melinda Gates, co-founder of the Bill & Melinda Gates Foundation
  Giorgia Meloni, Prime Minister of Italy
  Karen Lynch, CEO of CVS Health
  Julie Sweet, CEO of Accenture
  Jane Fraser, CEO of Citigroup

2021 

  MacKenzie Scott, philanthropist
  Kamala Harris, Vice President of the United States
  Christine Lagarde, President of the European Central Bank
  Mary Barra, CEO of General Motors
  Melinda Gates, co-founder of the Bill & Melinda Gates Foundation
  Abigail Johnson, President-CEO of Fidelity Investments
  Ana Patricia Botín, Executive Chairman of Banco Santander
  Ursula von der Leyen, President of the European Commission
  Tsai Ing-wen, President of Taiwan
  Julie Sweet, CEO of Accenture

2020 

  Angela Merkel, Chancellor of Germany
  Christine Lagarde, President of the European Central Bank
  Kamala Harris, Vice President-elect of the United States
  Ursula von der Leyen, President of the European Commission
  Melinda Gates, co-founder of the Bill & Melinda Gates Foundation
  Mary Barra, CEO of General Motors
  Nancy Pelosi, Speaker of the United States House of Representatives
  Ana Patricia Botín, Executive Chairman of Banco Santander
  Abigail Johnson, President-CEO of Fidelity Investments
  Gail Koziara Boudreaux, CEO of Anthem

2019 

  Angela Merkel, Chancellor of Germany
  Christine Lagarde, President of the European Central Bank
  Nancy Pelosi, Speaker of the United States House of Representatives
  Ursula von der Leyen, President of the European Commission
  Mary Barra, CEO of General Motors
  Melinda Gates, co-founder of the Bill & Melinda Gates Foundation
  Abigail Johnson, President-CEO of Fidelity Investments
  Ana Patricia Botín, Executive Chairman of Banco Santander
  Ginni Rometty, CEO of IBM
  Marillyn Hewson, CEO of Lockheed Martin

2018 

 Angela Merkel, Chancellor of Germany
 Theresa May, Prime Minister of the United Kingdom
 Christine Lagarde, Managing Director of the International Monetary Fund
 Mary Barra, CEO of General Motors
 Abigail Johnson, President-CEO of Fidelity Investments
 Melinda Gates, co-founder of the Bill & Melinda Gates Foundation
 Susan Wojcicki, CEO of YouTube
 Ana Patricia Botín, Executive Chairman of Banco Santander 
 Marillyn Hewson, CEO of Lockheed Martin
 Ginni Rometty, CEO of IBM

2017 

 Angela Merkel, Chancellor of Germany
 Theresa May, Prime Minister of the United Kingdom
 Melinda Gates, co-founder of the Bill & Melinda Gates Foundation
 Sheryl Sandberg, COO of Facebook
 Mary Barra, CEO of General Motors
 Susan Wojcicki, CEO of YouTube
 Abigail Johnson, President-CEO of Fidelity Investments
 Christine Lagarde, Managing Director of the International Monetary Fund
 Ana Patricia Botín, Executive Chairman of Banco Santander
 Ginni Rometty, CEO of IBM

2016 

 Angela Merkel, Chancellor of Germany
 Hillary Clinton, United States presidential candidate
 Janet Yellen, Chair of the U.S. Federal Reserve
 Melinda Gates, co-founder of the Bill & Melinda Gates Foundation
 Mary Barra, CEO of General Motors
 Christine Lagarde, Managing Director of the International Monetary Fund
 Sheryl Sandberg, COO of Facebook
 Susan Wojcicki, CEO of YouTube
 Meg Whitman, CEO of Hewlett Packard Enterprise
 Ana Patricia Botín, Executive Chairman of Banco Santander

2015 

 Angela Merkel, Chancellor of Germany
 Hillary Clinton, United States presidential candidate
 Melinda Gates, co-founder of the Bill & Melinda Gates Foundation
 Janet Yellen, Chair of the U.S. Federal Reserve
 Mary Barra, CEO of General Motors
 Christine Lagarde, Managing Director of the International Monetary Fund
 Dilma Rousseff, President of Brazil
  Sheryl Sandberg, COO of Facebook
 Susan Wojcicki, CEO of YouTube
 Michelle Obama, First Lady of the United States

2014 

 Angela Merkel, Chancellor of Germany
 Janet Yellen, Chair of the U.S. Federal Reserve
 Melinda Gates, co-founder of the Bill & Melinda Gates Foundation
 Dilma Rousseff, President of Brazil
 Christine Lagarde, Managing Director of the International Monetary Fund
 Hillary Clinton, former United States Secretary of State
 Mary Barra, CEO of General Motors
 Michelle Obama, First Lady of the United States
 Sheryl Sandberg, COO of Facebook
 Ginni Rometty, CEO of IBM

2013 

  Angela Merkel, Chancellor of Germany
  Dilma Rousseff, President of Brazil
  Melinda Gates, co-founder of the Bill & Melinda Gates Foundation
  Michelle Obama, First Lady of the United States
  Hillary Clinton, United States Secretary of State
  Sheryl Sandberg, COO of Facebook
  Christine Lagarde, Managing Director of the International Monetary Fund
  Janet Napolitano, United States Secretary of Homeland Security
  Sonia Gandhi, President of the Indian National Congress party 
  Indra Nooyi, chairperson and CEO of PepsiCo

2012 

  Angela Merkel, Chancellor of Germany
  Hillary Clinton, United States Secretary of State
  Dilma Rousseff, President of Brazil
  Melinda Gates, co-founder of the Bill & Melinda Gates Foundation
  Jill Abramson, Executive Editor of The New York Times
  Sonia Gandhi, President of the Indian National Congress party 
  Michelle Obama, First Lady of the United States
  Christine Lagarde, Managing Director of the International Monetary Fund
  Janet Napolitano, United States Secretary of Homeland Security
  Sheryl Sandberg, COO of Facebook

2011 

  Angela Merkel, Chancellor of Germany
  Hillary Clinton, United States Secretary of State
  Dilma Rousseff, President of Brazil
  Indra Nooyi, chairperson and CEO of PepsiCo
  Sheryl Sandberg, COO of Facebook
  Melinda Gates, co-founder of the Bill & Melinda Gates Foundation
  Sonia Gandhi, President of the Indian National Congress party 
  Michelle Obama, First Lady of the United States
  Christine Lagarde, Managing Director of the International Monetary Fund
  Irene Rosenfeld, chairperson and CEO of Mondelez International

2010 

  Michelle Obama, First Lady of the United States
  Irene Rosenfeld, chairperson and CEO of Mondelez International
  Oprah Winfrey, talk show host on The Oprah Winfrey Show
  Angela Merkel, Chancellor of Germany
  Hillary Clinton, United States Secretary of State
  Indra Nooyi, chairperson and CEO of PepsiCo
  Lady Gaga, singer, actress and record producer
  Gail Kelly, CEO of Westpac
  Beyoncé Knowles, singer, actress and record producer
  Ellen DeGeneres, talk show host on The Ellen DeGeneres Show

2009 

  Angela Merkel, Chancellor of Germany
  Sheila Bair, Chair of the U.S. Federal Deposit Insurance Corporation
  Indra Nooyi, chairperson and CEO of PepsiCo
  Cynthia Carroll, CEO of Anglo American plc
  Ho Ching, CEO of Temasek Holdings
  Irene Rosenfeld, chairperson and CEO of Mondelez International
  Ellen Kullman, CEO of DuPont
  Angela Braly, President-CEO of Anthem
  Anne Lauvergeon, CEO of Areva
  Lynn Elsenhans, chairperson, CEO and President of Sunoco

2008 

  Angela Merkel, Chancellor of Germany
  Sheila Bair,  Chair of the U.S. Deposit Insurance Corporation
  Indra Nooyi, chairperson and CEO of PepsiCo
  Angela Braly, President-CEO of Anthem
  Cynthia Carroll, CEO of Anglo American plc
  Irene Rosenfeld, chairperson and CEO of Mondelez International
  Condoleezza Rice, United States Secretary of State
  Ho Ching, CEO of Temasek Holdings
  Anne Lauvergeon, CEO of Areva
  Anne Mulcahy, chairperson and CEO of Xerox

2007 

  Angela Merkel, Chancellor of Germany
  Wu Yi, Vice Premier of the People's Republic of China
  Ho Ching, CEO of Temasek Holdings
  Condoleezza Rice, United States Secretary of State
  Indra Nooyi, chairperson and CEO of PepsiCo
  Sonia Gandhi, President of the Indian National Congress party 
  Cynthia Carroll, CEO of Anglo American plc
  Patricia Woertz, President-CEO of Archer Daniels Midland
  Irene Rosenfeld, chairperson and CEO of Mondelez International
  Patricia Russo, CEO of Alcatel-Lucent

2006 

  Angela Merkel, Chancellor of Germany
  Condoleezza Rice, United States Secretary of State
  Wu Yi, Vice Premier of the People's Republic of China
  Indra Nooyi, chairperson and CEO of PepsiCo
  Anne Mulcahy, chairperson and CEO of Xerox
  Sallie Krawcheck, CFO of Citigroup
  Patricia Woertz, President-CEO of Archer Daniels Midland
  Anne Lauvergeon, CEO of Areva
  Brenda Barnes, President-CEO of Sara Lee
  Zoe Cruz, co-president of Morgan Stanley

2005 

  Condoleezza Rice, United States Secretary of State
  Wu Yi, Vice Premier of the People's Republic of China
  Yulia Tymoshenko, Prime Minister of Ukraine
  Gloria Macapagal Arroyo, President of the Philippines
  Meg Whitman, President-CEO of eBay
  Anne Mulcahy, chairperson and CEO of Xerox
  Sallie Krawcheck, CFO of Citigroup
  Brenda Barnes, President-CEO of Sara Lee
  Oprah Winfrey, talk show host on The Oprah Winfrey Show
  Melinda Gates, co-founder of the Bill & Melinda Gates Foundation

2004 

  Condoleezza Rice, United States National Security Advisor
  Wu Yi, Vice Premier of the People's Republic of China
  Sonia Gandhi, President of the Indian National Congress party 
  Laura Bush, First Lady of the United States
  Hillary Clinton, United States Senator
  Sandra Day O'Connor, Associate Justice of the Supreme Court of the United States
  Ruth Bader Ginsburg, Associate Justice of the Supreme Court of the United States
  Megawati Sukarnoputri, President of Indonesia
  Gloria Macapagal Arroyo, President of the Philippines
  Carly Fiorina, CEO of Hewlett-Packard

See also 
Forbes list of the World's Most Powerful People
40 Under 40

References

External links 
 Official Forbes site: The World's Most Powerful Women

Forbes 100 Most Powerful Women
Forbes lists
Lists of 21st-century people